The 1986 WTA Tournament of Championships was a women's tennis tournament played on outdoor clay courts in Marco Island, Florida in the United States. It was part of the 1986 WTA Tour and was played from March 31 through April 6, 1986. Chris Evert won the singles title. The doubles competition was played as a round robin exhibition. Martina Navratilova, who had won all previous six singles titles at the event, elected to compete only in the doubles competition.

Finals

Singles
 Chris Evert defeated  Claudia Kohde-Kilsch 6–2, 6–4
 It was Evert's 4th singles title of the year and the 146th of her career.

Doubles
 Martina Navratilova /  Andrea Temesvári defeated  Elise Burgin /  Kathy Jordan 7–5, 6–2

References

External links
 ITF tournament edition details

Tournament of Champions
Avon Cup
Chrysler-Plymouth Tournament of Champions
Chrysler-Plymouth Tournament of Champions
Chrysler-Plymouth Tournament of Champions
Chrysler-Plymouth Tournament of Champions